Gagandeep Singh Lally (born 8 July 1995) is a Norwegian football midfielder who last played for Christiania BK.

Career
Hailing from Askim, he was discovered by Vålerenga in the Norway Cup as a child. He did not make it to Vålerenga's senior team, and returned to Østfold and Fredrikstad FK in August 2013. He featured in the first round of the 2014 Norwegian Football Cup. After a year at Fredrikstad, he went on to neighbors Sarpsborg 08 FF, and made his first-tier debut in September 2014 against Sandnes Ulf. However, he was not retained by Sarpsborg either, so ahead of the 2015 season he joined Ullern IF. After spending most of the 2016 season without a club, he made his debut for fourth-tier club Nordstrand IF in September 2016.

References

1995 births
Living people
People from Askim
Norwegian footballers
Fredrikstad FK players
Sarpsborg 08 FF players
Eliteserien players
Ullern IF players
Association football midfielders
Sportspeople from Viken (county)